Beckenham Station is a railway station on the Australian Transperth network in Western Australia. It is located on the Armadale Line,  from Perth Station serving the suburb of Beckenham.

History
The station opened in 1954 as Higham. The additional station, with two others on the Armadale line, marked the introduction of diesel-mechanical railcars on Perth's metropolitan passenger railways. Higham was renamed Beckenham in 1969. The platforms are staggered across William Street to minimise the time the level crossing is closed to road traffic.

In March 2014 an $8.1 million upgrade to the station and adjacent car parks was completed.

Future
Beckenham Station will potentially be rebuilt for the removal of the William Street level crossing. This is currently being considered as part of a Metronet project for the removal of level crossings on the Armadale line. The final decision on the William Street level crossing and Beckenham station will be made when the contract is awarded.

Services

Beckenham Station is served by Transperth Armadale Line services. Services to and from the Thornlie spur line run non-stop through the station.

The station saw 191,969 passengers in the 2013-14 financial year.

References

Armadale and Thornlie lines
Rail junctions in Western Australia
Railway stations in Perth, Western Australia
Railway stations in Australia opened in 1954